Stelis amoena, synonym Acianthera parahybunensis, is a species of orchid, native to Southeast Brazil.

References

amoena
Flora of Southeast Brazil